Philip James Davis (born 30 August 1990) is a professional Australian rules footballer playing for the Greater Western Sydney Giants in the Australian Football League (AFL).

Early life
Davis was born in Canberra, Australian Capital Territory, and lived there until the age of 14 when he relocated with his family to Adelaide. He attended school at Marist College Canberra and then St Peter's College, Adelaide. He was drafted by the Adelaide Crows with the tenth selection in the 2008 AFL Draft.

AFL career
Davis missed the end of the 2008 and the beginning of the 2009 seasons due to a shoulder injury. He played for North Adelaide in the South Australian National Football League (SANFL) and was close to selection by Adelaide towards the end of the 2009 season, being named as an emergency numerous times.

Davis made his AFL debut for Adelaide in Round 4, 2010 against Carlton at AAMI Stadium; he had 16 possessions and seven marks. 
Davis was nominated for the 2010 Rising Star in round 16 for his performance against Cameron Mooney.

In August 2011, Davis became the first player to announce that he would be moving to the new Greater Western Sydney club in 2012. This led Adelaide football manager Phil Harper to say the club was "bloody disappointed" to lose such a young player who was taken with a high draft pick in the 2008 AFL Draft.

On 14 February 2012, Davis was named as one of three inaugural Co-Captains of the GWS Giants, alongside former Brisbane Lions veteran Luke Power and Western Bulldogs import Callan Ward.

Statistics
 Statistics are correct to the end of Round 18, 2020

|- 
| scope=row | 2010 ||  || 16
| 15 || 1 || 0 || 100 || 89 || 189 || 70 || 21 || 0.1 || 0.0 || 6.7 || 5.9 || 12.6 || 4.7 || 1.4 || 0
|-
| scope=row | 2011 ||  || 16
| 3 || 0 || 0 || 21 || 13 || 34 || 21 || 4 || 0.0 || 0.0 || 7.0 || 4.3 || 11.3 || 4.0 || 1.3 || 0
|-  
! scope="row" style="text-align:center" | 2012
|style="text-align:center;" style="white-space: nowrap;||| 1
| 22 || 5 || 1 || 209 || 119 || 328 || 122 || 42 || 0.2 || 0.1 || 9.5 || 5.4 || 14.9 || 5.6 || 1.9 || 0
|-
| scope=row | 2013 ||  || 1
| 13 || 0 || 2 || 105 || 62 || 167 || 71 || 20 || 0.0 || 0.2 || 8.1 || 4.8 || 12.9 || 5.5 || 1.5 || 0
|-  
| scope=row | 2014 ||  || 1
| 11 || 0 || 0 || 81 || 52 || 133 || 55 || 18 || 0.0 || 0.0 || 7.4 || 4.7 || 12.1 || 5.0 || 1.6 || 0
|-
| scope=row | 2015 ||  || 1
| 12 || 0 || 0 || 81 || 62 || 143 || 59 || 14 || 0.0 || 0.0 || 6.8 || 5.2 || 11.9 || 4.9 || 1.2 || 0
|- 
| scope=row | 2016 ||  || 1
| 21 || 0 || 1 || 151 || 97 || 248 || 95 || 37 || 0.0 || 0.1 || 7.2 || 4.6 || 11.8 || 4.5 || 1.8 || 1
|-
| scope=row | 2017 ||  || 1
| 24 || 0 || 1 || 160 || 145 || 305 || 108 || 56 || 0.0 || 0.0 || 6.7 || 6.0 || 12.7 || 4.5 || 2.3 || 0
|- 
| scope=row | 2018 ||  || 1
| 22 || 0 || 1 || 181 || 153 || 334 || 128 || 38 || 0.0 || 0.5 || 8.2 || 7.0 || 15.2 || 5.8 || 1.7 || 0
|-
| scope=row | 2019 ||  || 1
| 23 || 1 || 1 || 196 || 120 || 316 || 162 || 42 || 0.0 || 0.0 || 8.5 || 5.2 || 13.7 || 7.0 || 1.8 || 3
|-  
| scope=row | 2020 ||  || 1
| 10 || 0 || 0 || 42 || 42 || 84 || 37 || 12 || 0.0 || 0.0 || 4.2 || 4.2 || 8.4 || 3.7 || 1.2 || 0
|- class=sortbottom
! colspan=3 | Career
! 176 !! 7 !! 7 !! 1327 !! 954 !! 2281 !! 919 !! 304 !! 0.0 !! 0.0 !! 7.5 !! 5.4 !! 13.0 !! 5.2 !! 1.7 !! 4
|}

Notes

References

External links

Living people
1990 births
Adelaide Football Club players
North Adelaide Football Club players
Greater Western Sydney Giants players
Australian rules footballers from South Australia
People educated at St Peter's College, Adelaide
Australian rules footballers from the Australian Capital Territory